Malcolm Gets (born December 28, 1963) is an American actor.  He is best known for his role as Richard in the American television sitcom Caroline in the City.  Gets is also a dancer, singer, composer, classically trained pianist, vocal director, and choreographer. His first solo album came out in 2009 from PS Classics.

Gets was nominated for a Tony Award in 2003 (Best Performance by a Lead Actor in a Musical for Amour) and was awarded the Obie Award in 1995.

Life and career
Gets was born in Waukegan, Illinois, the son of Lispbeth, an educator, and Terence Gets, a college textbook salesman. Both parents grew up in London, England. He moved with his family to New Jersey. He lived there until he was six, when his family moved to Gainesville, Florida. He has an older brother Erik, an older sister Alison and a younger sister Adrienne.

Gets started studying performing arts early in life. He began studying piano at age nine. This skill helped him pay his way through college. He began singing lessons at 14. He also danced with a studio in Gainesville as a teenager.

Gets skipped two years of K-12 education and graduated from Buchholz High School in Gainesville, Florida, aged 16. He then attended the University of Florida, where he won Best Newcomer's Award in acting and at age 24 earned a BFA in Theatre (1988).  Following that, he completed an MFA at the Yale Drama School.

Gets came out as gay in the late 1990s and lives with his partner.

Filmography

Television

Film

Theater

Gets was nominated for a Tony Award for Best Performance by a Leading Actor in a Musical in 2003 for his work in Amour.

Selected work
 Amadeus (1983)
 Cloud Nine (1984)
 Little Shop of Horrors as  Seymour (1986)
 As Is (1987)

Special Events
 Dreamgirls as Film Executive (2001)
 Passion as Colonel Ricci  (2004)

Off-Broadway
 Merrily We Roll Along as Franklin Shepard (1994 at the York Theatre)
 Hello Again as The Writer (1994 at Lincoln Center)
 A New Brain as Gordon Michael Schwinn (1998 at Lincoln Center)
 Boys and Girls as Jake (2002 at The Duke, 42nd Street)
 Vigil by [Morris Panych] as Kemp (2009 at the DR2 Theatre)
 Banished Children of Eve as Stephen Collins Foster (2010 at the Irish Repertory Theatre)

Gets was awarded the Obie Award for his work in Merrily We Roll Along and The Two Gentlemen of Verona in 1995.

Other appearances
 The Colorado Catechism by Vincent J. Cardinal as TY (1990 premiere at Yale School of Drama)
 The Boys from Syracuse Music by Richard Rodgers. Lyrics by Lorenz Hart. New Book by Nicky Silver. Based on the Original Book by George Abbott.  as Antipholus of Ephesus (1997 at City Center)
 Edward II  by Christopher Marlowe (2000 at American Conservatory Theater in San Francisco, California)
 Finian's Rainbow with music by Burton Lane and lyrics by EY Harburg as Og
1997 at Freud Playhouse on the campus of UCLA
2004 Irish Repertory Theatre
2005 at Westport Country Playhouse in Connecticut
 Camelot at the Hollywood Bowl as Mordred (2005)
 Party Come Here at Williamstown Theatre Festival as Orlando (2007)
 "Lisbon Traviata" at The Kennedy Center (2010)

Awards and nominations

Music
Soundtracks
 "Tradition/To Life" (1999) - in celebrity concert to benefit A.I.D.S. research, recorded as The S.T.A.G.E. Series: Adler, Bock, Coleman. 
 Barbara Cook Sings Mostly Sondheim (2001) - singles and duets recorded with Barbara Cook, such as "Into the Woods" and "Not While I'm Around".
 Grey Gardens (2009) - two duets recorded with Jessica Lange, such as "I Won't Dance" and "We Belong Together".

References

External links
 
 
 
 Malcolm Gets - March 2008 Interview at maninchair.com
 Malcolm Gets - Downstage Center interview at American Theatre Wing.org
 Malcolm Gets Fanpage

1964 births
American male film actors
American male musical theatre actors
American male television actors
American people of English descent
American gay actors
LGBT people from Illinois
Living people
Male actors from Chicago
Actors from Waukegan, Illinois
Male actors from Gainesville, Florida
Male actors from New Jersey
Buchholz High School alumni
University of Florida alumni
Yale School of Drama alumni
Obie Award recipients